The Central Zone cricket team is a first-class cricket team that represents central India in the Duleep Trophy and Deodhar Trophy. It is a composite team of players from six first-class Indian teams from central India competing in the Ranji Trophy: Chhattisgarh, Madhya Pradesh, Railways, Rajasthan, Uttar Pradesh and Vidarbha. Central Zone has the fourth strongest track record of all the zones in the Duleep Trophy, as they have won the Trophy  5 times, with the best team, North Zone having won 17 times.

Current squad

Famous players from Central Zone

 Pravin Amre
 Murali Kartik
 Mohammad Kaif
 Amay Khurasiya
 Suresh Raina
 R. P. Singh
 Praveen Kumar
 Piyush Chawla
 Umesh Yadav
 Naman Ojha
 Bhuvneshwar Kumar
 Ishwar Pandey
 Pankaj Singh

References

Indian first-class cricket teams